Vologda is a city in Russia. 
Vologda, Vologodsky may also refer to:
 Vologda (river), a river
 Vologda Oblast, a federal subject of Russia
 Vologodsky District, an administrative district of Vologda Oblast

Historical 
 Vologda Viceroyalty, an administrative division that existed from 1780 until 1796
 Vologda Governorate, an administrative division that existed from 1796 until 1929
 Vologda Oblast, Russian Empire, an administrative division of Vologda Viceroyalty
 Vologda electoral district (Russian Constituent Assembly election, 1917), a constituency (1917)

Railway stations 
 Vologda I railway station
 Vologda II railway station
 Vologda-Pristan railway station

Sport 
 Chevakata Vologda, a women's basketball club
 FC Dynamo Vologda, a football club
 FC Vologda, a football team

Other 
 Vologda butter, a type of butter
 Vologda Airport
 Vologda Aviation Enterprise, an airline
 Vologda State Technical University, a technical university
 Diocese of Vologda, an eparchy of the Russian Orthodox Church

See also 
 List of rural localities in Vologda Oblast